Ayọ Ni Mọ Fẹ is a Nollywood Yoruba drama film sequel that was directed by Tunde Kelani and released in 1994 through Mainframe Films and Television Productions.

Cast
 Yomi Ogunmola - Ayọ
 Bola Obot - Jumoke
 Yinka Oyedijo - Adunni
 Lere Paimo - Chief Adeleke

References

External links
 
 

1994 films
Films directed by Tunde Kelani
Yoruba-language films
Nigerian sequel films